Donald Clifford Gray  (born 1930) is a British Anglican priest, chaplain, and academic. From 1987 to 1998, he was Chaplain to the Speaker of the House of Commons and Rector of St Margaret's, Westminster.

Early life and education
Gray was born in Manchester, England in 1930, the son of Henry Hackett Gray. His grandfather, Richard Hackett, was Father of the Chapel printer at the Manchester Guardian and president of the Typographical Association. Having trained for the priesthood at King's College London and St Boniface Missionary College, Warminster. He was awarded a Doctor of Philosophy (PhD) by the University of Manchester in 1984.

Career

Ordained ministry
Gray was ordained in the Church of England as a deacon in 1956 and as a priest in 1957. He served as a priest in the Diocese of Manchester until becoming Rector of Liverpool the incumbent of Church of Our Lady and Saint Nicholas in 1974.  He also worked as the Chaplain of Huyton College Chapel, a private all-girls school from the 1970s until the early 1980s when he was Canon Grey but was called by a different title to the girls who went there, all of whom respected and like him greatly.

In 1987 he was appointed a canon of Westminster and Speaker's Chaplain.  His role within the Westminster Chapter was that of Rector of St. Margaret's, Westminster.  That role and that of Speaker's Chaplain have been practically, though not necessarily, combined for some years.

Military service
He was for several years an Honorary Chaplain to the Queen (a military form of chaplain to the Queen) through his involvement with the Territorial Army In 1970 he was awarded the TD (Territorial Decoration).  He was later appointed to the Royal Household as a chaplain to the Queen.

Honours
In 1988, Gray was elected a Fellow of the Royal Historical Society (FRHistS). On 22 February 2007, he was elected a Fellow of the Society of Antiquaries of London (FSA).

Selected works
Earth and Altar. Donald Gray, Alcuin / Canterbury Press (1986)
Chaplain to Mr Speaker. Donald Gray. HMSO (1991). 
Ronald Jasper, His Life, His Work, and the ASB. Donald Gray. SPCK (1997). 
Percy Dearmer : A Parson's Pilgrimage. Donald Gray. Canterbury Press (2000). 
Memorial Services. Donald Gray. Alcuin / SPCK (2002). 
All Majesty and Power : An Anthology of Royal Prayers. Donald Gray, Editor. Hodder & Stoughton (2000)
All Majesty and Power : An Anthology of Royal Prayers. Donald Gray, Editor. Eerdmans USA (2002) 
The 1927-1928 Prayer Book Crisis Part 1. Donald Gray. SCM-Canterbury Press (2005) 
The 1927-1928 Prayer Book Crisis Part 2. Donald Gray. SCM-Canterbury Press (2006)

References

1930 births
Living people
Alumni of the Theological Department of King's College London
Alumni of St Boniface Missionary College, Warminster
Canons of Westminster
Commanders of the Order of the British Empire
Fellows of the Society of Antiquaries of London
Fellows of the Royal Historical Society
Honorary Chaplains to the Queen